The Indian community in Malta is composed of around 3,200 people (estimate 2009), representing just shy of 0.5% of the population of Malta. The majority have been living in Malta since the Crown Colony Period.

Malta has a well-established small Sindhi trading community of about 45 families (200 people) of shop-keepers from the town of Hyderabad, Sindh (in today's Pakistan) that traces its roots to migration starting around 1887 when Malta was under British colonial rule. While both countries were under British rule, Malta served as one of the trading roots for exporting silk. Indian-made hand loom clothes were sought after by Europe for many centuries. Following the partition of India and due to immigration laws in Malta, Indian immigration to Malta stopped between 1952 and 1985.

Since the 1990s, a new wave of immigration from India brought to Malta a larger community from Kerala. There are currently about 3,000 Indians in Malta, working mainly in the health and hospitality sectors, almost half of whom stem from Kerala. Since 2017 Kerala Indians in Malta gather annually to celebrate the Onam festival.

History of the Sindhi community in Malta 

The historical community of Indian Maltese derives from the bahiband jati of the tiny Hindu Sindhi community. Following the British annexation of Sindh in 1843, a group of entrepreneurs from Hyderabad, Sindh set out for business opportunities in the rest of the Empire, originally trading in handicrafts from Sindhi (and hence becoming known as Sindhi workies), establishing a trade diaspora facilitated by the new Suez canal, the telegraph and the railway lines. Since the 1860s Hyderabadi traders soon set up business in Japan, Ceylon, Gold Coast, Gibraltar and Hong Kong.

The Sindhi trade diaspora intercepted the growing tourism from Britain and Northern Europe in the Mediterranean as a profitable market for high-value Sindhi handicrafts. They later diversified into silk and curiosities, adding products from the Far East, such as Japanese ceramics and kimono, to their catalogue. They also contributed to the growth of Gozo's Maltese lace industry, exporting it as far as Java and South Africa.

In 1887 the firm Pohoomull Brothers applied to set up a shop in British-ruled Malta. By 1910, more than 10 Sindhi firms had a business in Malta, which was a node in a global trade network. This small number of Sindhis held shops in the central shopping thoroughfare of Valletta, Strada Reale (later Kingsway, today's Republic Street) to cater for a high-end tourist market (a typical shopfront sign would read "Grand Indo-Egyptian Persian Bazaar – Suppliers to the German Imperial Family"), as well as branch shops and itinerary peddlers.

"From the time a ship dropped anchor to the time it left Malta, the visitor was tempted constantly by the Sindworkis' wares" (Falzon 2001). Maltese shops were local branches of the central firm, in Hyderabad, Sindh, from where personnel was selected (usually by kinship links) and sent to Malta for few years. Sindhi workers, as young as 15, used to share firm-provided housing in Valletta or Floriana, and migrant men were not allowed to bring along their spouses or dependants. Working time was extended (up to 15 hours a day, without any weekend) and workers were treated as personal servants by shop managers. Firms expected total loyalty from their employees and socialisation was not encouraged.

A change occurred in British ruled Malta in 1930s: with the great recession, the tourist market subsided, and many enterprising Sindh shop keepers cut their investments in Malta. The shops were sold to former employees, ready to operate at smaller profits. Shops became family-owned. The partition of India did not lead to an influx of Sindhis (Malta was deemed too small to offer opportunities) and the strict immigration rules of the 1952–1985 period meant that only newly-wed men to Maltese Indian girls could move to Malta. Sindhi businesses adapted by diversification their product lines, to cater more for the domestic consumption of the Maltese, moving in the import, wholesale and retail of textiles.

After the Second World War 
After the second world war, the Sindhis were ready to profit from the newly-found affluence of British ruled Maltese society, monopolising the textile trade. With the groth of female workforce in Malta since the 1970s, Sindhi traders introduce ready-made to cater for the lower-middle end of the market. Thanks to their network of trans-local trade, they soon became wholesalers of cloths and textiles for the Maltese retailers. The few firms which had remained in the trade of curiosities opened up since the 1980s to cheap electronics and adapted to the new influx of tourists in Malta in the 1970s and 1980s, moving into the souvenir market thanks to their long-held position on Valletta's thoroughfare. Further diversification and integration of Sindhi businesses within the wider Maltese economy is reported at the end of the 20th century.

Associations and cult 

In 1955 the Sindhi traders in Malta gathered in the Indian Merchants' Association (Malta), as the links to Hyderabad had been severed with the Partition. The association was never particularly active, and in 1989 it was renamed the Maltese-Indian Community with following address: 1st floor, 'Sukh Sagar',  'The Maltese-Indian Community Centre', 25 Triq Bella Vista, San Gwann SGN 2690 , marking the shift towards the self-perception as a localised ethno-cultural group. The centre includes a mandir open each Sunday from 11 to 12 am.

The small community continues to maintain Indian traditions in Malta, such as privately organising celebrations of Diwali, Holi Onam and other Hindu festivals. Hinduism and other religions of Indian origin (Buddhism, Sikhism and Jainism) are not officially recognized and are described as cults in Malta.

Typical surnames of the Sindhi Maltese community include Vaswani, Nandwani, Keswani, Bharwani and Balani.

Memorials
There is a memorial at Ta' Braxia Cemetery to twenty-eight Indians who fought on behalf of the British in World War I and died of wounds or illnesses in Malta. The bodies of 13 British-Indian soldiers and seven men of the Labour Corps were cremated at the Lazzaretto Cemetery on Manoel Island. Few of the Indians who died in Malta are Rifleman Dadrat Gurung, Havildar Jitbhadhur Thapa, Daffadar (Sergeant) Bal Ram, Driver Moti Lal, Driver Jai Ram and Labourer Khew Marak.

Deceased Hindus and of other eastern religions (Buddhists, Sikhs and Jain) are buried with Catholic funeral rites in Malta, instead of being cremated, with the permission of their families. This is, in part, due to cremation only having been legalized in Malta in 2019.

See also

 India–Malta relations
 Immigration to Malta
 Hinduism in Malta

References

Bibliography

Links 
 Multicultural Malta, Times of Malta

Immigration to Malta
Sindhi diaspora